Olešnice is a municipality and village in Hradec Králové District in the Hradec Králové Region of the Czech Republic. It has about 400 inhabitants.

Administrative parts
The village of Levín is an administrative part of Olešnice.

References

External links

Villages in Hradec Králové District